The tenth season of the American competitive television series BattleBots premiered on Discovery Channel on December 3, 2020 after being delayed due to the COVID-19 pandemic. This is the third season of Battlebots to premiere on Discovery Channel and the fifth season since the show was rebooted in 2015. The show introduced a new modified logo, with a pair of large red and blue "B"s, making a  "BB" logo atop the term "BATTLEBOTS".  The subtitle "Fight Night" was used for episodes featuring qualifying rounds.

MLB/NFL Sportscaster Chris Rose and former UFC fighter Kenny Florian returned to host for this tenth season, (fifth season of the reboot) of the BattleBots competition on Discovery. Also, arena announcer Faruq Tauheed, and his unique introductions, returned, as well as pit reporter Jenny Taft. 

Brand new this season are the "box-side suites", where the builders/teams can get a "bots-eye" look at the action. They have a chance to "scout or shout" for the rest of the field.

Pete Abrahamson (a.k.a. "Bot-Whisperer") joins as a new team member who started competing in the first BattleBots Competition in 1994 with his famous robot, Ronin.

Judges
This season, the judges score on a 11 point scale: 5 points for damage; 3 points for aggression; and 3 points for control.

The current judges are: former BattleBots contenders, Derek Young, Lisa Winter, and Jason Bardis.

Contestants
This season marked the 21st year of the BattleBots competition. The lineup features 62 of the best heavyweight robots to fight head-to-head in the Battle Arena. Their goal is to earn a top 32 ranking and qualify for the post-season where there will be knockout rounds until a winner-take-all fight to crown the 2020 BattleBots World Champion.

In previous seasons, an in-studio audience from the general population was present around the BattleBox to watch the event and add crowd reactions for the broadcast program. Due to COVID-19 pandemic restrictions during the recording of the episodes, the in-studio audience consisted only of the competing teams, with significant separation between the teams.

Seeding

Hydra (3-0)
Bloodsport (3-0)
Copperhead (3-0)
Uppercut (2-1)
Black Dragon (2-1)
End Game (2-1)
Sawblaze (2-1)
Whiplash (2-1)
Valkyrie (2-1)
Skorpios (2-1)
Jackpot (3-0)
MadCatter (3-0)
Beta (3-0)
Lock-Jaw (2-1)
Fusion (2-1)
Malice (2-1)
Gigabyte (2-1)
Tantrum (2-1)
Shatter! (2-1)
Ribbot (2-1)
Tombstone (1-2)
Rotator (1-2)
Witch Doctor (1-2)
Subzero (2-1)
HUGE (1-2)
Kraken (1-2)
Perfect Phoenix (2-1)
SlamMow! (2-1)
HiJinx (2-1)
Mammoth (2-1)
Gruff (1-2)
Hypershock (1-2)

Knockout stage

Episodes

References

2020 American television seasons
2021 American television seasons
BattleBots